Colubrina asiatica is a shrub in the family Rhamnaceae that is native to tropical and subtropical regions of the Old World, from eastern Africa to India, southeast Asia, tropical Australia, and the Pacific Islands. Common names include latherleaf, Asian nakedwood and Asian snakewood.

Description
Colubrina asiatica has a vine-like growth habit, sending out multiple stems that can reach  in length. Leaf margins are wavy or finely serrated (toothed). Flowers are small, greenish and bloom in clusters in leaf axils. Blooming can occur year-round. Fruit are  berry-like capsules with small, gray seeds. Seeds float and are tolerant to salt water, which allows the species to spread across oceans.

The plants grow in full to partial sun on upland sites.

As an invasive species
In Florida in the United States, Colubrina asiatica is an invasive species, capable of displacing native plants and altering the ecosystem. It is listed as a Type 1 exotic invader by the Florida Exotic Pest Plant Council. It has been found in the southern part of the Florida peninsula, including in Miami-Dade, Broward, Collier, Lee and Martin counties, and in the Florida Keys (Monroe County).  It was first collected in Florida in 1937.

References

External links

 Atlas of Florida Vascular Plants

asiatica
Flora of Africa
Flora of Asia
Flora of Australia
Plants described in 1826
Taxa named by Adolphe-Théodore Brongniart
Taxa named by Carl Linnaeus